Streptomyces arenae is a bacterium species from the genus Streptomyces which has been isolated from soil from Illinois in the United States. Streptomyces arenae produces pentalenolactone, 2,5-dihydrophenylalanine, naphthocyclinone and arenaemycine.

See also 
 List of Streptomyces species

References

Further reading

External links
Type strain of Streptomyces arenae at BacDive -  the Bacterial Diversity Metadatabase

arenae
Bacteria described in 1958